A Deafhead or Deaf Head is a hearing impaired Deadhead who attended concerts put on by the Grateful Dead or attends concerts from Grateful Dead offshoot bands, often in a specialized ticketing section (dubbed “The Deaf Zone”) set up for the concert. Many Deafheads are known for bringing inflated balloons to shows to feel the vibrations produced by the music.

Origins

Deafheads began popping up in the mid 80’s, mostly at shows near Gallaudet University, a school for the deaf near Washington DC.  The Grateful Dead’s soundman, Dan Healy, informally worked with them to ensure that they had their own space at these shows. The term Deafhead became more popularized when the promoter for the Grateful Dead’s 2015 reunion tour gave them their own designated section, complete with three ASL interpreters and a large video screen that allowed them to read the singers’ lips.

Deafheads in the present

The Grateful Dead do not currently tour, but Deafheads still pop up at shows put on by Dead & Company, a Grateful Dead offshoot led by former members Bob Weir, Bill Kreutzmann, and Mickey Hart along with musicians Oteil Burbridge, Jeff Chimenti, and John Mayer. They were praised for the amenities they provided in the Deaf Zone at their most recent shows at San Francisco’s Chase Center, wherein they set up the deaf zone close to the stage and provided a sign language interpreter.

References 

Grateful Dead
Musical subcultures